The Sepulveda Transit Corridor Project is a two-phased planned transit corridor project that aims to connect the Los Angeles Basin to the San Fernando Valley through Sepulveda Pass in Los Angeles, California, by supplementing the existing I-405 freeway through the pass. The corridor would partly parallel I-405, and proposed alternatives include a rapid transit (subway) or a monorail line connecting the G Line in the Valley to the D Line and E Line on the Westside, and the K Line near Los Angeles International Airport.

I-405 over Sepulveda Pass between I-10 and US 101, which the proposed transit line will run parallel to, is the busiest highway corridor in the United States, serving 379,000 vehicles per day.

Overview

The line is a long-established goal in Los Angeles transit planning. Proposition A, which imposed a half-cent sales tax in Los Angeles County to fund a regional transit system, was passed in 1980, and a Sepulveda Pass line was in the project map that was part of the proposition's documentation.

The Los Angeles County Metropolitan Transportation Authority (Metro) has $10 billion in funds available for construction planned to begin in 2026. The plan included in the Measure M transportation funding measure is to build improvements in three stages: additional lanes to be used for express bus service to open by 2028, an  transit project between the G Line's Van Nuys Station and the D Line Extension’s Wilshire/Westwood Station by 2035, and a planned extension to LAX with a 2059 completion date. In April 2017, Metro issued a Request for Proposals to study alternatives, and several companies sent unsolicited proposals to accelerate the project via public-private partnerships. The project's timeline is expected to be accelerated under the Twenty-eight by '28 initiative. The Metro Board of Directors in late 2019 will decide which concept routes to start the project's formal environmental studies.

Initial proposed routings and modes

In June 2018, Metro released its initial six alternative rail concepts for the corridor. All of the proposals provided connections between the G Line (at Sepulveda, Van Nuys, or both) and the E Line (at Expo/Sepulveda or Expo/Bundy), as well as to the D Line Extension, currently under construction, and to the East San Fernando Light Rail Transit Project, currently being planned. The proposals fell into four categories:

A standalone heavy rail line, primarily underground but possibly with some elevated sections in the Valley.
A continuation of the East San Fernando Light Rail Transit Project, primarily underground but with a possible elevated spur to Sepulveda station.
A monorail or rubber-tired metro line, underground on the Westside, elevated in the Valley, and running at grade or elevated along the 405.
An further extension of the heavy rail D Line, with a wye that would allow direct connections between the Valley and the E Line as well as from both to downtown. This option would be mostly underground but could include elevated sections in the Valley.

In January 2019, Metro released a refined second set of rail concepts for the corridor, eliminating light rail and rubber-tired metro technology from consideration and narrowing it down to four concepts:
Three routings for a heavy rail line, primarily underground but possibly with some elevated sections in the Valley.
A monorail, underground on the Westside, elevated in the Valley along Sepulveda Blvd, and running at grade or elevated along the 405, terminating at the Van Nuys Metrolink station.

In July 2019, Metro released a third refined rail concept after community input. These mainly covered the same routes but with a station added at Santa Monica Boulevard Station in reaction to public feedback. Both costs and ridership projections were higher for these proposals.

The feasibility study for both phases was completed and presented in November 2019, with no significant refinement from the July 2019 presentation. The study said that additional research was needed on whether the project would need to relocate or maneuver around a nine-foot wide DWP water pipe called the "Sepulveda Feeder." Additional studies were also called for on general station locations, tunnel design configuration, rider transfer patterns, and the identification of costs and cost reductions. The study also called for more information to be gathered on the impact of the Santa Monica Fault near Santa Monica Boulevard. The Metro Board then commenced the NEPA and CEQA scoping process.

Two engineering firms were chosen to prepare pre-development materials for the two potential modes. Monorail proposals were developed by BYD LA SkyRail Express, while heavy rail work proposals were prepared by Bechtel. By December 2021, six alternatives had been prepared for further consideration: three heavy rail and three monorail (one of which included a separate automated people mover to serve UCLA). On June 16, 2022, Metro reported that 93% of public comments favored a heavy rail option versus 7%, which favored monorail.

Phase One: Valley–Westside

Initial alternatives analysis
In November 2021, the CEQA notice for the project alternatives was released, with an environmental scoping period to begin in February 2022. Rail options were refined to three monorail and three heavy rail alternatives. Monorail options 1 and 2 did not include a station on the UCLA campus and proposed connecting transit options instead. The new alternatives are being considered for the Draft Environmental Impact Report north to south routes from the Valley to E Line were as follows:

In April 2021, Metro advanced five routes to the next study stage, including three routes selected as part of Metro's public-private partnership solicitation for the line. The P3 proposals came from Bechtel and BYD Company, with Bechtel submitting the same heavy rail alignment and station proposals as HRT-4, and BYD submitting two monorail proposals that differed from the original MRT-1 alternative studied by Metro.

The following table shows all potential metro stations and the alternatives for which they apply:

MSF Locations
Three Maintenance and Storage Facility (MSF) options are being proposed.
Monorail Maintenance and Storage Facility above existing Metro G Line Sepulveda Station Parking Lot. MRT 1, 2, and 3.
Van Nuys at Arminta. HRT 6.
Woodman at Van Nuys Metrolink Station. HRT 4 & 5.

Pre-Development 
In March 2021, Metro awarded contracts to two firms to develop two alternatives to advance the project. A plan for conventional heavy rail (HRT) is being developed by Bechtel. The rival design is a monorail as planned by BYD LA SkyRail Express.

A scoping process carried out by Metro from November 2021 to February 2022 showed a heavy majority favoring heavy rail over monorail, with the tally being 93% to 7%, respectively. Heavy rail alternatives were cited by comments as having better transfer options to other lines, faster travel times, and more familiarity with the Los Angeles Metro Rail system. Results of an official public opinion survey conducted by Metro during July and August 2022 to gauge public opinions about the Sepulveda Transit Corridor Project were released in December 2022. After describing details of both rail types were presented to residents, an HRT underground option stood at 71% approval, with respondents citing shorter travel time and fewer surface impacts.

The Project is currently in the environmental review phase involving the development of an Environmental Impact Report (EIR) under the California Environmental Quality Act (CEQA), and subsequently an Environmental Impact Statement (EIS) under the National Environmental Policy Act (NEPA). The Draft EIR will evaluate Project alternatives representing a range of rail transit modes, alignments, and station locations for the Sepulveda Transit Corridor Project. Once the Draft EIR has been completed and circulated for public comment, a Locally Preferred Alternative (LPA) will be recommended to the Metro Board of Directors. After the LPA is identified, the Final EIR, Draft EIS, and Final EIS will be prepared to complete the environmental review process.

Phase Two: Westside–LAX

Initial alternatives analysis
Early concepts for phase two from E Line to the (at the time unbuilt but now operational) K Line were released in 2019, with detailed connections to the under-construction LAX Automated People Mover. Metro hopes to complete the feasibility study by 2019 and begin an environmental impact review along with phase one.

There are two main modes for phase two of the corridor. Five proposed concepts begin at either Expo/Bundy station or Expo/Sepulveda station, contingent on the terminus of the first phase of the project. All routes terminate at the LAX/Metro Transit Center station, which is currently under construction as part of the Crenshaw/LAX Transit Corridor Project. This terminus station will offer transfers to the K Line and LAX Automated People Mover.

Concepts include routing south along Sepulveda Boulevard, Overland Boulevard, Centinela Boulevard, and I-405, with possible intermediate stops at Venice Boulevard, Culver City Transit Center, the Howard Hughes Center, and Sepulveda Boulevard at Manchester Boulevard. The Sepulveda Boulevard route option would be completed as below-grade heavy rail, while the I-405 option could be completed as either a combination of elevated and below-grade heavy rail or a combination of elevated and below-grade monorail.

The July 2019 updated concepts released by Metro for phase two added a stop along Santa Monica Boulevard per public popular demand. They added the fifth concept, extending the east/west purple line extension terminus south towards LAX. A one-boarding HRT trip from LAX to Downtown Los Angeles along Centinela Blvd.

All north-to-south routes from the E Line to LAX are:

The following table shows all potential metro stations and the alternatives for which they apply:

Alternative 5's concept for the Westside-LAX phase of the Sepulveda Transit Corridor Project would extend the Purple Line subway south down Centinela Ave along the same route as the other proposed Centinela Ave concepts (Alt 2). This concept would provide a one-seat ride from the LAX Automated People Mover to Downtown Los Angeles but would require passengers from the San Fernando Valley to transfer at Westwood/UCLA station to travel further south.

The second phase of the Sepulveda Transit Corridor Project is not due to break ground until 2048.

Advocacy 
Transit advocates have proposed combining the East San Fernando Valley Light Rail Transit Project and the Sepulveda Transit Corridor Project into a single study to connect Sylmar, Van Nuys, the Orange Line, Sherman Oaks, UCLA, and the future Westwood/UCLA D Line station. Metro studies declined the LRT merge option and stated HRT would provide faster times and more occupancy on trains.  Future extension phases south to the E Line, LAX, South Bay, or beyond are also being advocated and proposed. Metro proposed a Centinela Avenue route to LAX or thru Sepulveda Boulevard. No studies have been allocated funds.

Phase One of the project is part of Metro's Twenty-eight by '28 initiative, which aims to complete its list of expansions in time for the 2028 Summer Olympics. Metro is looking into a public/private partnership to accelerate the opening.

Construction 
Measure R and Measure M timelines call for construction to begin in 2043, though the first phase may be accelerated in preparation for the 2028 Summer Olympics.

References

Notes

External links 
 Sepulveda Transit Corridor Project
 East San Fernando Valley Light Rail Transit Project
 Measure R
 LA SkyRail Express — monorail planning

Transportation in Los Angeles
Transportation in the San Fernando Valley
Los Angeles County Metropolitan Transportation Authority
Los Angeles Metro Rail projects
Public transportation in Los Angeles
Public transportation in Los Angeles County, California
Santa Monica Mountains
Sepulveda Boulevard
Proposed railway lines in California
2028 in rail transport